The Jump is a four-part British television crime drama, written by Adrian Hodges and adapted from the 1995 novel by Martina Cole, that first broadcast on ITV on 6 September 1998. The series stars Adrian Dunbar as Alan Cox, an ex-con who offers to help Mafia wife Donna Brunos (Susan Vidler) to spring her husband George (Jonathan Cake) from prison after he is put behind bars for a brutal armed robbery.

John Light, Sue Johnston, Michael Angelis and Peter Birrel also star in principal roles. The Jump was first released on VHS on 26 January 2000, before being Region 2 DVD in the United Kingdom on 13 March 2006 via Network, in a double pack with the television adaptation of Cole's novel Dangerous Lady.

Cast
 Adrian Dunbar as Alan Cox 
 Jonathan Cake as George Brunos
 Susan Vidler as Donna Brunos
 John Light as Mario Brunos
 Sue Johnston as Maeve Brunos 
 Michael Angelis as Donald Lewis 
 Peter Birrel as Pa Brunos
 Siobhan Burke as Carol Jackson 
 Julian Kerridge as Sadie Gold 
 Billy McColl as Ricky Brett
 Anjela Lauren Smith as Vida Dawson 
 Danny Webb as Davey Jackson
 Andy Serkis as Steven Brunos 
 Mark Benton as Timmy Lambert
 Jimmy Flint as Johnnie H. 
 Peter Gowen as Paddy Donovan
 Frank Harper as Anthony Calder

Episodes

References

External links

1998 British television series debuts
1998 British television series endings
1990s British crime television series
1990s British drama television series
1990s British television miniseries
ITV television dramas
Television series by ITV Studios
Television shows produced by Central Independent Television
English-language television shows
Television shows based on British novels
Television shows set in London